Pontania is a genus of common sawflies in the family Tenthredinidae. There are more than 80 described species in Pontania.

Species
These 89 species belong to the genus Pontania:

 Pontania acuminata Marlatt
 Pontania acutifoliae Zinovjev, 1985
 Pontania agama Rohwer
 Pontania algida Benson, 1941
 Pontania alpinae (Vikberg, 2003)
 Pontania amentivora Rohwer
 Pontania anomaloptera (Foerster, 1854)
 Pontania aquilonis Benson, 1941
 Pontania arbusculae Benson, 1941
 Pontania arcticornis Konow, 1904
 Pontania articornis Konow, 1904
 Pontania bastatae Vikberg, 1970
 Pontania bella (Zaddach, 1876)
 Pontania borealis Marlatt
 Pontania brachycarpae Rohwer
 Pontania brevicornis (Foerster, 1854)
 Pontania breviserratae Kopelke, 1989
 Pontania bridgmanii (Cameron, 1883)
 Pontania bruneri Marlatt
 Pontania californica Marlatt
 Pontania collactanea (Foerster, 1854)
 Pontania collectanea (Förster, 1854)
 Pontania consors Marlatt
 Pontania crassicornis Rohwer
 Pontania crassipes (Thomson, 1871)
 Pontania cyrnea Liston, 2005
 Pontania dolichura (Thomson, 1871)
 Pontania elaeagnocola Kopelke, 1994
 Pontania foetidae Kopelke, 1989
 Pontania foveata Rohwer
 Pontania gallarum (Hartig, 1837)
 Pontania glabrifrons Benson, 1960
 Pontania glaucae Kopelke, 1994
 Pontania gracilis Marlatt
 Pontania hastata Vikberg, 1970
 Pontania hastatae Vikberg, 1970
 Pontania helveticae Kopelke, 1986
 Pontania herbaceae (Cameron, 1876)
 Pontania joergenseni Enslin, 1916
 Pontania kriechbaumeri Konow, 1901
 Pontania kukakiana Kincaid
 Pontania lapponicola Kopelke, 1994
 Pontania leavitti Rohwer
 Pontania leucostoma Rohwer
 Pontania lucidae Rohwer
 Pontania maculosa Kopelke, 1989
 Pontania marlatti Ross
 Pontania megacephala Rohwer
 Pontania melanosoma Rohwer
 Pontania montivaga Kopelke, 1991
 Pontania myrsiniticola Kopelke, 1991
 Pontania myrsinticola Kopelke, 1991
 Pontania myrtilloidica Kopelke, 1991
 Pontania nevadensis
 Pontania nigricantis Kopelke, 1986
 Pontania nigrita Marlatt
 Pontania nivalis Vikberg, 1970
 Pontania norvegica Kopelke, 1991
 Pontania nudipectus Vikberg, 1965
 Pontania obscura Kopelke, 2005
 Pontania ora Kincaid
 Pontania pedunculi (Hartig, 1837)
 Pontania peninsularis Kincaid
 Pontania petiolaridis Rohwer
 Pontania populi Marlatt
 Pontania proxima (Lepeletier)
 Pontania proxima (Serville, 1823)
 Pontania pumila Rohwer
 Pontania purpureae (Cameron, 1884)
 Pontania pustulator Forsius, 1923
 Pontania resinicola Marlatt
 Pontania reticulata Malaise, 1920
 Pontania reticulatae Malaise, 1920
 Pontania retusae Benson, 1960
 Pontania robusta Marlatt
 Pontania rotundidentata Zinovjev & Vikberg
 Pontania rugulosa Marlatt
 Pontania saliciscinereae (Retzius, 1783)
 Pontania saliscinereae (Retzius, 1783)
 Pontania samolad Malaise, 1920
 Pontania terminalis Marlatt
 Pontania triandrae Benson, 1941
 Pontania tuberculata (Benson, 1953)
 Pontania tundra Kincaid
 Pontania utensis Rohwer
 Pontania varia Kopelke, 1991
 Pontania vesicator (Bremi, 1849)
 Pontania viminalis (Linnaeus, 1758)
 Pontania virilis Zirngiebl, 1955

References

External links

 

Tenthredinidae